WOI (640 AM) – branded Iowa Public Radio – is a non-commercial educational radio station licensed to serve Ames, Iowa. Owned by Iowa State University, the station covers the Des Moines metropolitan area. Broadcasting a mix of public radio and talk radio, WOI is the flagship station for Iowa Public Radio's News Network and the market member station for NPR, Public Radio International, and the BBC World Service. The WOI studios are located at Iowa State University's Communications Building, while the station transmitter resides southwest of Ames. Besides a standard analog AM transmission, WOI is relayed over low-power Ames FM translator K234CN (104.7 FM) and is available online.

Historically, WOI is one of the oldest radio stations in the United States, and one of the oldest surviving stations in North America, having begun experimental transmissions in 1911.

History
The history of WOI can be traced back to 1911 when physics professor "Dad" Hoffman set a transmission line between the Campus Water Tower and the Engineering Building and set up a wireless telegraph station.  By 1913 this was known as experimental station 9YI and it was sending and receiving weather reports by Morse code on a regular basis.

The first sound broadcast was an hour of concert music on November 21, 1921.  The Commerce Department issued a full radio license for station WOI in April 1922 and the first regular broadcast took place on April 28, 1922.  The original call sign 9YI is now W0YI and is retained by the ISU Campus Radio Club, with the amateur radio station in the Electrical Engineering building.

WOI may be the oldest fully licensed noncommercial station west of the Mississippi River.  Another university radio station in Iowa, WSUI at the University of Iowa in Iowa City, also began telegraph transmissions in 1911 and also has claims to being the earliest educational station west of the Mississippi.  Other Midwestern universities also started experimental stations in the 1910s: the University of Minnesota's KUOM and St. Louis University's WEW in 1912 and the University of Wisconsin's WHA in 1915.

The first regular programming on WOI was farm market reports gathered by ticker tape and Morse code, broadcast throughout the state.  Another early staple was sporting events by Iowa State's athletic teams.  In 1925, "The Music Shop" aired for the first time. One of the longest-running programs in the history of radio, it moved to WOI-FM in the 1970s before going off the air in 2006.  In 1927. another longtime favorite, "The Book Club" was added; it also aired until 2006.

On December 1, 1949, Iowa State launched an FM adjunct to WOI, WOI-FM at 90.1 MHz. WOI-TV was subsequently launched in 1950 as the first television station in central Iowa. It was also the first commercial TV station in the country owned by an educational institution. It was affiliated with all four networks of its time before it became solely an ABC affiliate in 1955.  WOI-TV was sold by the Iowa Board of Regents on March 1, 1994; the station is now owned by TEGNA.

WOI-AM-FM became a charter member of National Public Radio when it began its regular schedule of afternoon news program All Things Considered in 1971.

Today WOI's programming consists of both NPR and locally produced talk shows along with local news and BBC news updates. The classical music of the early years migrated exclusively to WOI-FM in the 1960s. When the radio services of Iowa's state universities were merged into Iowa Public Radio in 2004, WOI became the flagship of IPR's Operations and IT services.

Due to its location near the bottom of the AM dial and Iowa's mostly flat landscape (with near-perfect ground conductivity), WOI's non-directional 5,000 watt daytime signal reaches most of the state of Iowa, similar to 50,000 watt WHO. With a good radio, WOI can also be heard in parts of Missouri, Minnesota, Nebraska and South Dakota. A single tower is used during the day. At night, because of the nighttime propagation the signal is reduced to 1,000 watts at night and two towers are used in a phased array configuration to protect KFI in Los Angeles, concentrating the signal eastward around Des Moines, Waterloo and Cedar Rapids.

References

External links

 Iowa Public Radio – IPR News
 Spark to Voice - History of 9YI and early WOI

µ
Radio stations established in 1922
NPR member stations
1922 establishments in Iowa
Radio stations licensed before 1923 and still broadcasting